2018 ICC World Cricket League Division Two was a cricket tournament that took place in February 2018 in Namibia. The United Arab Emirates won the tournament, after beating Nepal by 7 runs in the final. Canada and Namibia finished third and fourth respectively and remained in Division Two. Oman and Kenya finished fifth and sixth respectively and were both relegated to Division Three. Following Kenya's last-place finish in the tournament, their captain Rakep Patel and their coach Thomas Odoyo both resigned.

Oman and Canada were the top two teams in the 2017 ICC World Cricket League Division Three tournament in Uganda and were promoted as a result. They were joined by the bottom four teams from the 2015–17 ICC World Cricket League Championship to determine the final two spots in the 2018 Cricket World Cup Qualifier. Following the conclusion of the round-robin stage, Nepal and the United Arab Emirates claimed the final places in the World Cup Qualifier.

The group-stage match between Kenya and Namibia was originally scheduled to take place on 9 February. No play was possible, due to a wet outfield, so the match was moved to the following day. The match was abandoned on the reserve day, also due to rain. Under the rules of the tournament, the fixture was rescheduled to be played on 13 February, after the matches on the 11 and 12 February reached a conclusion.

Teams
Top 2 teams from the 2017 ICC World Cricket League Division Three:
 
 

Bottom 4 teams from the 2015–17 ICC World Cricket League Championship

Squads
The following players were selected for the tournament:

Points table

Fixtures
The following dates and venues were confirmed for the tournament:

Round-robin

Playoffs

Fifth-place playoff

Third-place playoff

Final

Final standings

References

External links
 Series home at ESPN Cricinfo

2018, 2
World Cricket League Division 2